Phoenix was an English manufacturer of automobiles, motorcycles and tricars (motor tricycles) active from 1903–1926. It was founded by a Belgian, Joseph van Hooydonk, at his factory in Holloway Road, North London, and named after the Phoenix Cycle Club.

The company moved from its London base to Letchworth, Hertfordshire, in 1911, but failed to survive the 1920s going into liquidation in 1924 but assembling a few more cars in the following two years.

The Letchworth factory went on to be used for car manufacture by Ascot and Arab.

Production

The first product was a motor tricycle called the Trimo with an engine imported from the Belgian Minerva company.  This was followed in 1905 by a single seat four wheeler the Quadcar with 6/7hp twin cylinder Fafnir engine.

A proper four wheel car was introduced in 1908 as the 8/10 with 8hp engine and chain drive to a three speed transmission with further chain to the rear axle.

After the move to Letchworth a larger 11.9hp model with 1496 cc 4 cylinder engine, three speed transmission and worm final drive. It had the radiator behind the engine, Approximately seven cars a week were being made by a workforce of 150 at the outbreak of World War I.

The 11.9 was re-introduced in 1919 still with the scuttle radiator but changing to a more conventional front radiator in 1921. For 1922 the 11.9 was replaced by the 12/25 with Meadows 1795 cc and four speed transmission.

A small number of six cylinder cars were made in 1925.

Models

Other Phoenix car companies
The Phoenix name has been used by several British car makers including:

Phoenix Motor Works in Southport (1902-1904)

Phoenix Carriage Co in Birmingham (1905)

Phoenix Automotive of Moreton-in Marsh, Gloucestershire

Phoenix Car Works Ltd in Pluckley, Kent

See also
 List of car manufacturers of the United Kingdom

References

External links
 Autopendium page on Phoenix

Vintage vehicles
Defunct motor vehicle manufacturers of England
Motor vehicle manufacturers based in London
Companies based in North Hertfordshire District
Car manufacturers of the United Kingdom